Food Food is an Indian food and lifestyle channel that was launched in January 2011. It is a joint venture between Malaysia-based Astro Overseas Limited (Astro), Sanjeev Kapoor, Kartik Gaikwad and Mogae Consultants. Food Food is available on satellite in India through Tata Sky, Videocon D2H, Airtel Digital TV  and other major cable networks and MSOs across India. The channel is also available in US, Canada, UAE, Qatar and Mauritius. Food Food is the first Indian channel that is shot entirely in high definition.

The channel airs cooking and food shows hosted by chefs Sanjeev Kapoor, Ajay Chopra, Vikas Khanna, Saransh Goila, Rakesh Sethi, Shailendra Kekade, Shilarna Vaze, Shipra Khanna, Shazia Khan, Harpal Singh Sokhi, Madhu Sneha, Shantanu Gupte and Amrita Raichand.

Awards

FOOD FOOD received three awards at the Indian Telly Awards 2012.
 Best TV Channel Packaging
 Mummy Ka Magic as the Best Cookery Show
 Khata Rahe Mera Dil as the Best Travel Show

Programs
 Royal Rasoi hosted by Chandrachur Singh
 Band Baaja Buffet
 Cook Smart - Chef Sanjeev Kapoor teaches smart and easy ways of preparing Indian and international dishes 
 Firangi Tadka - hosted by chefs Saransh Goila and Shilarna Vaze, the show explores the differences and similarities between Indian cuisine and global cuisines
 Food Food Maha Challenge
 Health Mange More
 Mummy Ka Magic - celebrity-turned-chef Amrita Raichand prepares easy and healthy food that children will love to eat; she suggests tips and tricks that can turn a simple home cooked meal into a delicious affair so that the children are encouraged to eat healthy food
 Namaste Breakfast
 Ready Steady Cook
 Sanjeev Kapoor's Kitchen
 Secret Recipes with Sanjeev Kapoor
 Sirf 30 Minute
 Style Chef - Chef Shailendra Kekade shares his exceptional cooking skills with a phenomenal amount of creativity, talent and imagination. He is a recognized food stylist across food and beverages industry, and has extraordinary skills in making every recipe look stunning on a plate.
 Tea Time - chef Rakesh Sethi shares his experiences and experiments in the kitchen with his viewers and prepares Indian and international recipes that can be served during tea or snack time
 Turban Tadka - chef Harpal Singh Sokhi prepares classic Indian dishes and teaches true Desi-style cooking to his viewers in an entertaining manner
 Sunny Side Up - chef Shilarna Vaze, popularly known as chef Chinu, demonstrates in a very chirpy and fun way, some classy and continental food
 Mummy Ka Magic is hosted by model Amrita Raichand.
 Khata Rahe Mera Dil is a show about the famous street food of India. Its host, Gurpal Singh, takes viewers on an entertaining ride as he goes hunting for the best street food in the bazaars.

References

External links
 

Television networks in India
Hindi-language television channels in India
Food and drink television
Television channels and stations established in 2011
Astro Malaysia Holdings